= Mount Maburgos =

Mountain in Batangas, Philippines

- Location within Luzon Location within Philippines

Highest point
- Elevation: 282 m (925 ft)
- Coordinates: 13°59′32″N 120°38′19″E

Mount Maburgos a mountain in the Philippines. It is located in the province of Batangas and the Calabarzon region, north-west of the country, 80 km south-west of the national capital Manila.
